Margaret Johnson (1919–1939) was an American jazz pianist who accompanied many famous jazz musicians of the 1930s.

She was born in 1919 in Chanute, Kansas. She was a child prodigy on piano. She moved to Kansas City in the early 1930s. As a young teenager her style was compared to Mary Lou Williams. As a teenager, she played in the bands of Harlan Leonard on tour. At the age of 15, she had already formed her own group. In 1936 she took over for Count Basie when he left his Orchestra for an engagement in Chicago. She also substituted for Mary Lou Williams in Andy Kirk's band in New York.  Later, she worked with Clarence Williams, Bubber Miley, Thomas Morris, Louis Armstrong and Sidney Bechet. She can also be heard on four tracks that Billie Holiday's orchestra recorded in September 1938 with Lester Young.

According to The Rough Guide to Jazz, Johnson was one of the pioneering female figures in jazz. Her piano style was tasteful and, according to those who heard her live, effortless. She was nicknamed "Countess," and even "Queenie". She was a powerful musician whose style recalls both Basie and Earl Hines. She died of tuberculosis in 1939.

References

American jazz pianists
20th-century American women pianists
20th-century American pianists
1919 births
1939 deaths
20th-century deaths from tuberculosis
Tuberculosis deaths in the United States